José Cobos (born October 11, 1980) is a Mexican former professional baseball pitcher.

Career
Cobos played in the Mexican League since 2005 for the Sultanes de Monterrey, Tuneros de San Luis, Pericos de Puebla, and Rojos del Águila de Veracruz.

In the Mexican Pacific League, he played for the Venados de Mazatlán, Cañeros de Los Mochis and Naranjeros de Hermosillo. 

He also played for the Mexico national baseball team at the 2013 World Baseball Classic.

References

External links

1980 births
Living people
Baseball players from Veracruz
Mexican League baseball pitchers
People from Tuxpan, Veracruz
Pericos de Puebla players
Rojos del Águila de Veracruz players
Sultanes de Monterrey players
2013 World Baseball Classic players